Mondovì railway station is the railway station serving the comune of Mondovì, in the Piedmont region, northwestern Italy. It is the junction of the Turin–Savona and Cuneo–Mondovì railways.

The station is currently managed by Rete Ferroviaria Italiana (RFI). Train services are operated by Trenitalia.  Each of these companies is a subsidiary of Ferrovie dello Stato (FS), Italy's state-owned rail company.

History
The station was opened from 1933, with the tract Fossano–Ceva railway.

Features
Seven tracks of which are equipped with platforms, pass through the station.

Train services
The station is served by the following services:

Express services (Regionale veloce) Turin - Fossano - San Giuseppe di Cairo - Savona
Regional services (Treno regionale) Fossano - San Giuseppe di Cairo
Tourist services (Treno storico) Turin - Ceva - Ormea

See also

 History of rail transport in Italy
 List of railway stations in Piedmont
 Rail transport in Italy
 Railway stations in Italy

References

External links

Railway stations in Piedmont
Railway stations opened in 1933